The 1888 Home Nations Championship was the sixth series of the rugby union Home Nations Championship. Three matches were played between 4 February and 10 March. It was contested by Ireland, Scotland and Wales. England were excluded from the Championship due to their refusal to join the International Rugby Football Board.

Table

Results

Scoring system
The matches for this season were decided on goals scored. A goal was awarded for a successful conversion after a try, for a dropped goal or for a goal from mark. If a game was drawn, any unconverted tries were tallied to give a winner. If there was still no clear winner, the match was declared a draw.

The matches

Wales vs. Scotland

Wales: Ned Roberts (Llanelli RFC), George Bowen (Swansea), Arthur Gould (Newport),  Pryce-Jenkins (London Welsh), Jem Evans (Cardiff), William Stadden (Cardiff), Tom Clapp (Newport) capt., Richard Powell (Newport), Willie Thomas (London Welsh), Alexander Bland (Cardiff), Frank Hill (Cardiff), Dick Kedzlie (Cardiff), John Meredith (Swansea), T. Williams (Swansea), William Howell (Swansea)

Scotland: HFT Chambers (Edinburgh U.), Bill Maclagan (London Scottish), HJ Stevenson (Edinburgh Acads), MM Duncan (Cambridge U.), CE Orr (West of Scotland), CFP Fraser (Glasgow University), CW Berry (Fettesian-Lorettonians), AT Clay (Edinburgh Acads), A Duke (Royal HSFP), TW Irvine (Edinburgh Acads), MC McEwan (Edinburgh Acads), DS Morton (West of Scotland), C Reid (Edinburgh Acads) capt., LE Stevenson (Edinburgh U.), TB White (Edinburgh Acads)

Wales achieved their first victory over Scotland with a debut try from Pryce-Jenkins. After the try Wales switched their tactics to spoil the game by lying on the ball or kicking the ball into touch to prevent Scottish play. During the game Scotland grounded the ball over the Welsh line on five occasions but were not given a try by referee Chambers.

Ireland vs. Wales

Ireland: Dolway Walkington (NIFC), Maxwell Carpendale (Monkstown), DF Rambaut (Dublin U.), CR Tillie (Dublin U.), RG Warren (Landsdowne), JH McLaughlin (Derry), HJ Neill (NIFC) capt., EW Stoker (Wanderers), FO Stoker (Wanderers), WG Rutherford (Tipperary), T Shanahan (Landsdowne), CM Moore (Dublin U.), J Moffatt (Belfast Academy), RH Mayne (Belfast Academy), W Ekin (Queen's College)

Wales: Ned Roberts (Llanelli RFC), Pryce-Jenkins (London Welsh), George Bowen (Swansea), Charlie Arthur (Cardiff), Jem Evans (Cardiff), Charlie Thomas (Newport), Tom Clapp (Newport) capt., Richard Powell (Newport), Frank Hill (Cardiff), Dick Kedzlie (Cardiff), Willie Thomas (London Welsh), Alexander Bland (Cardiff), John Meredith (Swansea), T. Williams (Swansea), William Howell (Swansea)

This was Ireland's first win over Wales, which saw Ireland employ Shanahan, a forward, into a wing-forward role. This is believed to be the first time a forward had been used to fill a winging position. Shanahan had an excellent game, setting up Warren's try and scoring himself. Wales played poorly, with eight of the players, including captain Clapp, never selected to represent Wales again.

This game was also noted as the first game in which the Welsh selectors made no changes in the Welsh pack keeping the same forward players as the match against Scotland. It was also the last time Wales fielded nine forwards, adopting the four threequarter system after its successful use in the encounter with the New Zealand Māori in December.

Scotland vs. Ireland

Scotland: HFT Chambers (Edinburgh U.), Bill Maclagan (London Scottish), HJ Stevenson (Edinburgh Acads), DJ McFarlan (London Scottish), CE Orr (West of Scotland), Andrew Ramsay Don-Wauchope (Fettesian-Lorettonians), CW Berry (Fettesian-Lorettonians), Alexander Malcolm (Glasgow University), A Duke (Royal HSFP), TW Irvine (Edinburgh Acads), MC McEwan (Edinburgh Acads), DS Morton (West of Scotland), C Reid (Edinburgh Acads) capt., HT Ker (Glasgow Acads), TB White (Edinburgh Acads)

Ireland: RW Marrow (Lisburn), Maxwell Carpendale (Monkstown), A Walpole (Dublin U.), CR Tillie (Dublin U.), RG Warren (Landsdowne), JH McLaughlin (Derry), HJ Neill (NIFC) capt., EW Stoker (Wanderers), WA Morton (Dublin U.), Victor Le Fanu (Landsdowne), T Shanahan (Landsdowne), CM Moore (Dublin U.), J Moffatt (Belfast Academy), RH Mayne (Belfast Academy), W Ekin (Queen's College)

Although Ireland lost to Scotland for the sixth consecutive time, their superior score over Wales enabled them to win the Championship for the first time. The match was also notable for being the last international game by Scotland's influential captain Charles Reid, who ended his career with twenty caps, a record for a forward.

References

External links

Bibliography
 
 

1887-88
1887–88 in British rugby union
rugby union
rugby union
Home Nations Championship
1887–88 in Scottish rugby union